Kristel Ngarlem (born July 20, 1995) is a Canadian weightlifter. She won the silver medal in the women's 87 kg event at the 2022 Commonwealth Games held in Birmingham, England. She is a bronze medallist at the Pan American Weightlifting Championships. She represented Canada at the 2020 Summer Olympics in Tokyo, Japan.

Career 
She represented Canada in the women's 69 kg event at the 2014 Commonwealth Games held in Glasgow, Scotland where she finished in 5th place. In 2015, she competed in the women's 69 kg event at the Pan American Games in Toronto, Canada where she finished in 4th place. At the 2017 Summer Universiade held in Taipei, Taiwan, she finished in 4th place in the women's 75 kg event.

In 2020, she won the bronze medal in the women's 76kg event at the Roma 2020 World Cup in Rome, Italy.

In June 2021, Ngarlem was named to Canada's Olympic team at the 2020 Summer Olympics in Tokyo, Japan. She competed in the women's 76 kg event.

Personal life 
She was born to a Chadian father and Québécois mother.

She studied criminology at the Université de Montréal in Montreal, Quebec, Canada.

References

External links 
 

Living people
1995 births
Sportspeople from Montreal
Canadian female weightlifters
Weightlifters at the 2015 Pan American Games
Pan American Games competitors for Canada
Competitors at the 2017 Summer Universiade
Weightlifters at the 2014 Commonwealth Games
Weightlifters at the 2022 Commonwealth Games
Commonwealth Games medallists in weightlifting
Commonwealth Games silver medallists for Canada
Weightlifters at the 2020 Summer Olympics
Olympic weightlifters of Canada
21st-century Canadian women
Medallists at the 2022 Commonwealth Games